"What Lovers Do" is a song by American band Maroon 5 featuring American singer SZA. It was released on August 30, 2017, as the third single from the band's sixth studio album Red Pill Blues (2017). The song contains an interpolation of the 2016 song "Sexual" by Neiked featuring Dyo, therefore Victor Rådström, Dyo and Elina Stridh are credited as songwriters.

Background and release
After extensive touring in support of their fifth studio album V (2014), Maroon 5 began the writing and recording sessions for their sixth studio album. On October 12, 2016, the band released the tropical house single "Don't Wanna Know", featuring American rapper Kendrick Lamar. Another single, entitled "Cold", featuring American rapper Future, was released on February 14, 2017. Both songs later appeared in the deluxe and Japanese editions of Red Pill Blues. In August 2017, videos and Snapchats from the lead singer Adam Levine revealed that the group was recording the music video for "What Lovers Do", with SZA.

On August 26, 2017, the name "What Lovers Do" and cover art for the track were revealed on the online media knowledge base website Genius. The band later announced with the single's release date on August 30.

Composition
"What Lovers Do" runs for approximately three minutes and 16 seconds. It was written by Adam Levine, Starrah, Jason Evigan and Solána Imani Rowe and was produced by Evigan, Ben Billions, Sam Farrar and Noah Passovoy. Victor Radstrom, Dyo, and Elina Stridh are also credited songwriters on the record, as songwriters of "Sexual" by Neiked.

The song is performed in the key of B major with a tempo of 110 beats per minute. The song follows a chord progression of E–Gm–F–B–E, and the vocals in the song span from F3 to D5 in common time.

Commercial performance
In the United States, "What Lovers Do" reached number nine on the Billboard Hot 100, becoming Maroon 5's 13th and SZA's first top 10. By September 2017, it had sold 116,000 copies in the United States according to Nielsen SoundScan; later, it would reach double platinum status as certified by the RIAA. The track reached number seven on the ARIA Singles Chart, becoming the band's tenth single in Australia to reach the top 10.

Music video
The music video for "What Lovers Do" was released on Vevo, on September 28, 2017, and was directed by Joseph Kahn. The video follows a young Adam Levine and SZA chasing each other through a meadow. Now, as adults, they chase each other through the Arctic, a running field, the ocean, and underwater. Later in Las Vegas, Levine plays with SZA in a poker game until he loses to her and grabs SZA, transforming into a 50-foot version of himself. Levine attacks the city until the police, military and Boy Scout troopers eliminate him. At the end, Levine is in a hospital, injured with SZA as his nurse.

Lyric video
A lyric video was released on September 15, 2017. This video using as found footage, which features a red and white lollipop when it melts into slime.

Live performances
Maroon 5 performed "What Lovers Do" for the first time of the Rock in Rio concert at Barra Olympic Park in Rio de Janeiro on September 16, 2017. On September 28, they performed the song at the Shoreline Amphitheatre in Mountain View, CA. The band promoted "What Lovers Do" live during their appearances on The Tonight Show Starring Jimmy Fallon (with SZA), The Today Show, The Ellen DeGeneres Show, The Voice and Jimmy Kimmel Live!, respectively.

Track listing

Digital download
"What Lovers Do" (featuring SZA) – 3:16

Digital download – Slushii Remix
"What Lovers Do" (Slushii Remix) – 4:14

Digital download – A-Trak Remix
"What Lovers Do" (A-Trak Remix) – 3:37

Credits and personnel
Credits adapted from Red Pill Blues album liner notes.

Recording locations
Recorded in Los Angeles, California at Conway Recording Studios and Westlake Recording Studios, and Chumba Meadows in Tarzana, California
Mixed and mastered in Virginia Beach at Mixstar Studios

Vocals

Adam Levine – lead vocals
SZA – featured vocals
Sam Farrar – additional vocals

Starrah – additional vocals
Noah "Mailbox" Passovoy – additional vocals
Ammo – additional vocals

Musicians and technicians

John Armstrong – assistant engineer
Benjamin "Ben Billions" Diehl – writer, co-producer, keyboards, programming
Jesse Carmichael – guitar
Eric Eylands – assistant engineer
Jason Evigan – writer, producer, vocal producer, programming
Sam Farrar – bass, digital editing, additional percussion, additional producer
Serban Ghenea – mixing
John Hanes – mixing engineer
Matt Flynn – drums, percussion

Adam Levine – writer
Mickey Madden – bass
PJ Morton – keyboards
Noah "Mailbox" Passovoy – digital editing, additional percussion, engineer, keyboards, additional producer, vocal producer
Solana Rowe – writer
Starrah – writer
Gian Stone – engineer, vocal producer, programming
James Valentine – guitar

Charts

Weekly charts

Year-end charts

Certifications

Release history

References

2017 singles
2017 songs
Maroon 5 songs
SZA songs
Songs written by Adam Levine
222 Records singles
Interscope Records singles
Songs written by SZA
Songs written by Starrah
Songs written by Jason Evigan
Music videos directed by Joseph Kahn
Song recordings produced by Jason Evigan
Songs written by Ben Billions